Humerana humeralis is a species of frog in the family Ranidae.
It is found in Bangladesh, India, Myanmar, Nepal, and possibly Bhutan.
Its natural habitats are subtropical or tropical moist lowland forests and rivers.
It is threatened by habitat loss.

References

humeralis
Amphibians of Bangladesh
Amphibians of Myanmar
Frogs of India
Amphibians of Nepal
Amphibians described in 1887
Taxonomy articles created by Polbot